Sopot may refer to:

Albania 
 Sopot, Albania (Sopoti), a region, mountain and village

Antarctica 
 Sopot Ice Piedmont, an ice piedmont on Livingston Island

Bosnia and Herzegovina 
 Sopot, Konjic, a village in the municipality Konjic

Bulgaria 
 Sopot, Plovdiv Province, a town and seat of the Sopot Municipality
 Sopot Municipality, Bulgaria
 Sopot, Lovech Province, a village in the Ugarchin Municipality

Croatia 
 Sopot, Krapina-Zagorje County, a village in the city of Pregrada
 Sopot, Zagreb, a neighbourhood of Zagreb
 Sopot, Vinkovci, an archeological site located near the city of Vinkovci

North Macedonia 
 Sopot, Veles, a village in Veles Municipality
 Sopot, Kumanovo, a village in Kumanovo Municipality
 Sopot, Kavadarci, a village in Kavadarci Municipality
 Sopot, Sveti Nikole, a village in Sveti Nikole Municipality

Poland 
 Sopot (river), a tributary of the Tanew
 Sopot, a town in Pomeranian Voivodeship

Romania 
 Sopot, Dolj, a commune in Dolj County

Serbia 
 Sopot, Belgrade, a town and municipality
 Sopot, Pirot, a village in the municipality of Pirot

Kosovo 
 Sopot, Gjakova, a village in the municipality of Gjakova

See also
 
 Grodzisko in Sopot, an early settlement in Poland
 Šopot, a village in the city of Benkovac, Croatia
 Șopot (disambiguation)
 Stary Sopot, a village in Poland